Leonard B. Campbell (23 December 1946 – 22 November 2018) was a Scottish footballer. He started his career with junior side Yoker Athletic and rejoined after three seasons with Dumbarton. He died in November 2018.

References

1946 births
Scottish footballers
Dumbarton F.C. players
Scottish Football League players
2018 deaths
Association football wing halves
Yoker Athletic F.C. players